Mikhail Igorevich Kostin (born 10 March 1985) is a former Russian professional footballer.

Club career
He played five seasons in the Russian Football National League for four clubs.

External links
 
 

1985 births
Footballers from Luhansk
Living people
Russian footballers
Association football midfielders
FC Dynamo Stavropol players
FC Daugava players
FC Metallurg Lipetsk players
FC Shinnik Yaroslavl players
FC Belshina Bobruisk players
FC Dynamo Bryansk players
FC Spartak Moscow players
FC Avangard Kursk players
Latvian Higher League players
Belarusian Premier League players
Russian expatriate footballers
Expatriate footballers in Belarus
Expatriate footballers in Latvia
FC Spartak Nizhny Novgorod players